Amir Masoud Boroumand (12 November 1928 – 8 March 2011) was an Iranian footballer who played as a striker. He was the Iran national team's captain during the 1950s.

Club career
In 1945, Boroumand he started his club career with Shahbaz, the third team of Shahin. The following year, he became a reserve player for Shahin, before becoming a starter in 1947. He stayed at the club until 1958.

Whilst studying for a PhD at Washington University in the United States, he played for the university's football team, the Washington University Bears, and won the double 1958 Eastern USA Soccer League and Eastern USA Soccer Cup.

Boroumand played football whilst studying at the American University of Beirut in Lebanon, between 1959 and 1961, and became known as "the Iranian Prince".

International career
Boroumand won his first cap for the Iran national team on 26 October 1947, in a friendly match played in Tehran between Iran and Turkey. He scored Iran's only goal in that match when Iran lost 3–1. He was the captain of Iran national football team during the 1950s. He participated in the 1951 and 1958 Asian Games.

Personal life 
Boroumand studied at the University of Tehran, holding a bachelor in judicial law and a PhD. In 1958 Boroumand studied for a PhD in administrative management at Washington University, in the United States. Between 1959 and 1961 Boroumand lived in Lebanon, and majored in management at the American University of Beirut, holding a bachelor's and master's degree. He had been part of Board of Directors of Shahin, from 1984 until his death in 2011.

On 8 March 2011, Boroumand was taken to a hospital in Tehran, Iran, due to a lung infection and myocardial infarction, where he died. He was laid to rest at the Behesht-e Zahra cemetery in Tehran.

Career statistics

International 
 Scores and results list Iran's goal tally first, score column indicates score after each Boroumand goal.

Honours 
Shahin FC
 Tehran Hazfi Cup: 1948, 1949, 1950; runner-up: 1953, 1957
 Tehran Football League runner-up: 1947, 1949, 1951, 1956

Washington University Bears
 Eastern USA Soccer League: 1958
 Eastern USA Soccer Cup: 1958

Iran
 Asian Games Silver medal: 1951

References

External links
 

1928 births
2011 deaths
Sportspeople from Tehran
Iranian footballers
Association football forwards
Shahin FC players
Iranian expatriate footballers
Expatriate soccer players in the United States
Expatriate footballers in Lebanon
Iranian expatriate sportspeople in the United States
Iranian expatriate sportspeople in Lebanon
Iran international footballers
Asian Games silver medalists for Iran
Asian Games medalists in football
Footballers at the 1951 Asian Games
Medalists at the 1951 Asian Games
Footballers at the 1958 Asian Games
Persepolis F.C. non-playing staff
Washington University in St. Louis alumni
American University of Beirut alumni